Galow may refer to:
Galow, Iran, a village in East Azerbaijan Province, Iran
Galów, Świętokrzyskie Voivodeship, Poland
Gałów, Lower Silesian Voivodeship, Poland